Ilkley Rugby Club is an English rugby union club based in Ilkley, West Yorkshire. The first XV team play in Regional 1 North East, The Club has been strengthened this summer with a large influx of new players. Ilkley also has a very successful sevens team who in the 2017 season won the national sevens competition.

Honours
Yorkshire Shield winners (3): 1993/4, 2010/11, 2013/14
Yorkshire 2 promotion: 2003/04
Durham/Northumberland 1 v Yorkshire 1 promotion play-off winners: 2007–08
Yorkshire 1 champions: 2013–14
North 1 East champions: 2014–15
National Intermediate Cup finalists: 2014
National Sevens Champions: 2017
North 1 East Champions: 2021-22

References

English rugby union teams
Ilkley
Sport in West Yorkshire
Rugby clubs established in 1899